Fitiuta County is a county in the Manu'a District in American Samoa.

Demographics

Fiti'uta County was first recorded beginning with the 1912 special census. Regular decennial censuses were taken beginning in 1920.

Villages
Leusoali'i
Maia

References 

 

Populated places in American Samoa